La Historia Continua... Parte IV is a compilation album released by Marco Antonio Solís on January 24, 2012.

Track listing

All songs written and composed by Marco Antonio Solís

References

Marco Antonio Solís compilation albums
2012 compilation albums